Elmer R. Raguse (May 9, 1901 – March 2, 1972) was an American sound engineer mostly associated with the Hal Roach Studios. He was nominated for eight Academy Awards in the categories Best Sound Recording and Best Effects.

Editor Richard Currier said, "In pictures, if you can't get an effect one way, you figure out another way of getting it. But with Raguse, there was only one line you could follow, and that was that." He wanted to record a gunshot on a project Raguse was involved in, but he refused on the grounds that it would break the light valve. Currier questioned him on it, imagining the valve couldn't be prohibitively expensive. Raguse confirmed it would be twenty cents, so Currier fired the gun in defiance.

Selected filmography
Best Sound
 General Spanky (1936)
 Topper (1937)
 Merrily We Live (1938)
 Of Mice and Men (1939)
 Captain Caution (1940)
 Topper Returns (1941)

Best Effects
 One Million B.C. (1940)
 Topper Returns (1941)

References

External links

1901 births
1972 deaths
American audio engineers
Special effects people
Artists from Springfield, Massachusetts
20th-century American engineers